Dun Troddan is an iron-age broch located about  southeast of the village of Glenelg, Highland, in Scotland. It is one of the best-preserved brochs in Scotland.

Location
Dun Troddan stands on a level rock platform north of the Abhainn a’ Ghlinne Bhig, in the lower reaches of Gleann Beag. It lies just north of the minor road leading south from Glenelg. It can be accessed via a steep path.

History
Dun Troddan was first sketched in about 1720 when it was still an intact tower. It was robbed for stone in 1722 during the construction of Bernera Barracks in Glenelg. The broch was visited by Thomas Pennant in 1772, and it was still a substantial structure, although it had lost the upper gallery by this time. It was cleared of "debris" without any supervision and consolidated by the Office of Works in the years between 1914 and 1920. The broch is now in the care of Historic Environment Scotland.

Description

The entrance is on the southwest side, and is now roofless. On the left side of the entrance passage is a small side-chamber, sometimes called a "guard cell". The broch has features now missing from Dun Telve; these include a number of postholes in the floor and a hearth. Built into the hearth is a broken quern-stone.

An internal doorway in the remaining high part of the wall provides access to a stairway. From here it is possible to ascend nine stairs to a first floor landing. At the end of the landing can be seen the first step which would have led up the next flight of stairs.

References

External links

Glenelg Brochs: Dun Telve And Dun Troddan, Historic Scotland

Archaeological sites in Highland (council area)
Brochs
Historic Environment Scotland properties
Scheduled Ancient Monuments in Highland